The 2010–11 Boston Bruins season was the Bruins' 87th season in the National Hockey League (NHL). The Bruins were the winners of the 2011 Stanley Cup, winning their first championship in 39 years.

Off-season 
At the 2010 NHL Entry Draft in Los Angeles, California, Boston selected Tyler Seguin with their first-round pick, second overall. A week earlier, on June 16, 2010, Bruins owner Jeremy Jacobs and principal Charlie Jacobs announced that Cam Neely had been named president of the Boston Bruins. Neely, a former player and 2005 Hall of Fame inductee, became the eighth president in club history.

The Bruins sought to "tweak the composition" during the off-season, trading puck-moving defenseman Dennis Wideman to the Florida Panthers in exchange for Nathan Horton.

The Reading Royals, Boston's affiliate within the ECHL, renewed their relationship during the off-season. This marked the second year the organizations shared affiliation, with the Royals playing host to several Bruins prospects including goaltender Matt Dalton and defenseman Rob Kwiet.

Pre-season
On June 21, 2010, the Bruins announced their seven-game pre-season schedule. Closing out the schedule were two exhibition matches, the first in Belfast, Northern Ireland, against the Belfast Giants Select, a unified team composed of an All-Star selection of the best EIHL players from each team. The Bruins went on to beat the Giants Select 5–1 after being held scoreless for the first period. Rookie star Tyler Seguin scored a pair of goals. The Bruins then faced off against Bili Tygri Liberec of the Czech Extraliga in their final pre-season match, with veteran Patrice Bergeron putting on a five-point display that included two breakaway goals in a 7–1 victory for the Bruins.

Regular season 
As part of the 2010 Compuware NHL Premiere Games, the Bruins began their season on Saturday, October 9, playing against the Phoenix Coyotes at the O2 Arena in Prague, Czech Republic. There they split their two games with the Coyotes. The Bruins spent much of the months of October, November and December playing well but slightly behind the Montreal Canadiens for first-place in the division before passing the Canadiens on December 27 with a 3–2 shootout win over the Florida Panthers. Play during this time was highlighted by excellent play for goaltender Tim Thomas, who started the season as a backup but had five shutouts by the middle of December, and by Milan Lucic's excellent offensive production, including his first natural hat-trick on November 18. In January, the Bruins continued to hold first-place in the division, aided at one point by hat-tricks from Patrice Bergeron and Zdeno Chara on January 11 and January 17, respectively. The Bruins started February with fight-filled wins against the Dallas Stars, whom they beat 6–3, and the Canadiens, against whom they picked up their first win of the season on their fourth try by a score of 8–6. The Bruins then hit a three-game losing streak, but recovered to string together a seven-game winning streak that stretched into March. The first six wins of the streak were on the road, including a 3–1 win in the Bruins' only game of the regular season against the Vancouver Canucks, which led the NHL at that time for points and would eventually win the Presidents' Trophy. After the streak, the Bruins would go on to lose six of their next seven games, including a 4–1 loss to their rivals, the Canadiens, in which team captain Zdeno Chara was nearly suspended for a hit on Max Pacioretty. They nonetheless managed five points during this time, as three of their losses came in overtime. Following this lapse, the Bruins responded with a win over the New Jersey Devils and a 7–0 win in their last game of the regular season against the Montreal Canadiens. Two games later, the Bruins clinched a playoff spot with a 2–1 win over the Philadelphia Flyers. In the next game, Tim Thomas picked up his ninth shutout of the season. Two games later, in their first game in April, the Bruins clinched the Northeast Division with a 3–2 win in their last ever game against the Atlanta Thrashers, who were set to relocate to Winnipeg for the next season.

The Bruins tied the New York Rangers for the most shutouts for, with 11.

Standings

Schedule and results

Pre-season

Regular season

Playoffs

The Boston Bruins qualified for the Stanley Cup Playoffs for the fourth consecutive season. Their conference quarter-final matchup was against their archrival, the sixth-seeded Montreal Canadiens. The series started off disastrously for the Bruins, as they dropped two games in their own building. They would come back to win the next three games and, after dropping Game 6, would ultimately win Game 7 in overtime at home on a Nathan Horton goal. The next round featured a sweep of the second-seeded Philadelphia Flyers who, the previous year, had come back from down three games to none against the Bruins to win the series. This propelled them to their first conference finals since the 1992 Stanley Cup playoffs. In the conference finals, the Bruins matched up against the fifth-seeded Tampa Bay Lightning. After dropping the first game by a lopsided score, the Bruins fought back to win the next two games before dropping game four to knot the series at 2–2. The Bruins took Game 5 to put them a win away from the conference championship. Game 6 was another loss for the Bruins, but Game 7 resulted in a 1–0 victory to send them to their first Stanley Cup Finals in 21 years. In the finals, the Bruins met the Presidents' Trophy-winning Vancouver Canucks. Vancouver took the first two games at home, each by a goal, to build a 2–0 series lead. The Bruins responded with two lopsided wins at home to tie the series 2–2, but Vancouver won Game 5 in their building to move the Bruins one game away from losing the Cup. The Bruins managed to win Game 6 to tie the series and then won their third Game 7 of the post-season to win the Stanley Cup, their first in 39 years. After Game 7, Bruins goaltender Tim Thomas was named the winner of the Conn Smythe Trophy for the post-season's most valuable player.

Playoff log

 Scorer of game-winning goal in italics

Player statistics

Skaters
Note: GP = Games played; G = Goals; A = Assists; Pts = Points; +/- = Plus-minus; PIM = Penalty minutes

†Denotes player spent time with another team before joining Bruins. Stats reflect time with the Bruins only.
‡Denotes player was traded mid-season. Stats reflect time with the Bruins only.
(G)Denotes goaltender.
PIM totals include bench infractions.

Goaltenders
Note: GPI = Games Played In; TOI = Time on ice; GAA = Goals against average; W = Wins; L = Losses; OT = Overtime/shootout losses; SO = Shutouts; SA = Shots Against; GA = Goals against; SV% = Save percentage

Awards and records

Awards

On April 6, prior to the game against the New York Islanders, the team announced its award winners for the season.

Tim Thomas was named First Star of the Week on November 1, 2010 and again on January 24, 2011. He was also named Second Star of the Month for October. Patrice Bergeron was named Second Star of the week on January 17, 2011, and First Star of the Month for January.

Records

Milestones

Tyler Seguin, Jordan Caron, Jamie Arniel, Steven Kampfer and Matt Bartkowski all made their NHL debuts this season.

Transactions 
The Bruins have been involved in the following transactions during the 2010–11 season.

Trades

Free agents acquired

Free agents lost

Player signings

Draft picks 

Boston's picks at the 2010 NHL Entry Draft in Los Angeles, California.

Notes on draft picks
 The Toronto Maple Leafs' first and second-round picks went to the Bruins as the result of a trade on September 18, 2009, that sent Phil Kessel to Toronto in exchange for these picks. 
 The Carolina Hurricanes' fourth-round pick went to the Bruins as the result of a trade on July 24, 2009, that sent Aaron Ward to Carolina for this pick and Patrick Eaves.
 The Chicago Blackhawks' seventh-round pick went to the Bruins as the result of a trade on June 26, 2010, that sent Boston's seventh-round pick in 2011 to Chicago for this pick.
 The Bruins' first-round pick, 15th overall, was traded to the Florida Panthers as a result of the trade in which the Bruins acquired Nathan Horton and Gregory Campbell on June 22, 2010.
 The Bruins' third-round pick, 75th overall, was traded to the Buffalo Sabres as a result of the trade in which the Bruins acquired Daniel Paille on October 20, 2009.

Affiliates

Providence Bruins
The Providence Bruins, based in Providence, Rhode Island, are the Bruins AHL affiliate.

Reading Royals
The Reading Royals, based in Reading, Pennsylvania, are the Bruins ECHL affiliate. The Royals will again look to compete in the Kelly Cup playoffs.

See also
 2010–11 NHL season

References

B
Boston Bruins
Boston Bruins seasons
Eastern Conference (NHL) championship seasons
Stanley Cup championship seasons
Boston Bruins
Boston Bruins
Boston Bruins
Bruins
Bruins